The bamboo woodpecker (Gecinulus viridis) is a species of bird in the family Picidae. It is found in Myanmar, Laos, Thailand and the Malaysia. Its natural habitats are subtropical or tropical dry forests and subtropical or tropical moist lowland forests.

References

 Picture - Oriental Bird Club Images.  

bamboo woodpecker
Birds of Laos
Birds of the Malay Peninsula
Birds of Myanmar
Birds of Thailand
bamboo woodpecker
bamboo woodpecker
Taxonomy articles created by Polbot